This is a list of episodes from the reality television series Storage Wars: Texas, which airs on the cable network A&E. The episodes listed here are in a broadcast order, not production order, based on the episode guide on AETV.com.

The descriptions of the items listed in this article reflect those given by their sellers and others in the episodes prior to their appraisal by experts as authentic or inauthentic, unless otherwise noted. Episodes of this show started premiering on December 6, 2011.

Series overview

Episodes

Season 1 (2011–2012)

Season 2 (2012–2013)

Season 3 (2013–2014)

Episode statistics
The episodes were not aired in the order that they were filmed. Therefore, the * column in each season's episode list indicates the sequential order of that episode.

Season 1 (2011−2012)

Season 2 (2012−2013)

Notes
 1 Jenny and Victor split the cost of $1,600 with both of them paying $800, with Jenny taking all the furniture and a box of Beanie Babies, and Victor takes everything else in the unit.
 2 Ricky and Bubba didn't buy a unit, but profited $100 from Jenny who paid them to crack a safe.
 3 Moe and Mary split the cost of a $950 unit, so they both paid $475 to cover the cost of the unit. They both shared the profit made on the unit.

Other notes
 In "Rhymes with Witch", Jerry and Lesa spent $875 and made a profit of $1,330.
 In "I'd Do Anything for Lesa (But I Won't Do That)", Jerry and Lesa did not score a locker.
 In "The Cock Fighter from Mexico", Rudy Castro spent $175 and made a profit of $705.
 In "The Ninja and the Pit Master", "J.D."Thorne spent $725 and made a profit of $1,900.

Season 3 (2013−2014)

Notes
 1 Moe and Mary buy a locker together for $800. The last episode Moe is seen in is the second episode of the third season "Take a Deep Breath, It's Lesa!"
 2 Jenny and Mary end their partnership in the episode "Take That Beethoven!" after a disagreement on the project.
 3 Ricky and Bubba receive $100 after winning a coin toss against Kenny Stowe.
 4 Jenny Grumbles said this was her best profit out of any locker she has purchased in her career. She bought the locker for $450.00 and made a profit of $3,530.00.
 5 Ricky brought along his mother to the auction, Puffy. They both purchased a locker and then later went through and sorted through the items/merchandise.

Other notes
In "Take a Deep Breath, It's Lesa!", Jerry and Lesa spent $2,400 on a locker and made a profit of $320.
In "British Invasion", David Kay spent $150 on a locker and made a profit of $3,650.
In "Swinging with the Jenemy", David Kay spends $325 on a unit and makes a profit of $525.
In "Ka-Chingaladas!", Kenny Stowe spent $900 on a locker and made a profit of $5,350.
In "It's Always Sonny In Texas", Matt Blevins spent $200 on a locker and made a profit of $1,390.
In "Stowe-Age Wars", Kenny Stowe spent $1,550 on four lockers and made a profit of $1,920.
In "Built For Pleasure Not Speed", Rudy Castro spent $300 on a locker and made a profit of $1,050. Jerry and Lesa spent $2,150 on a locker and made a profit of $400.
In "Winners of the Centuries", David Kay spent $900 on a locker and made a profit of $4,600.
In "Take That Beethoven!", Jerry and Lesa spent $250 on a locker and made a profit of $925. Matt Blevins didn't buy a locker.
In "Yo! Mary Raps", Kenny Stowe spent $300 on a locker and made a profit of $1,850.
In "Hands Off the Embroidery", Matt Blevins didn't buy a locker. He was also warned by auctioneer Walt Cade about his conduct, being threatened with eviction from the auction.
In "Cardboard Couture", Kenny Stowe spent $500 on two lockers and made a profit of $925. Ricky and Bubba didn't buy a locker but won $100 from Kenny betting on a coin flip.
In "Spurs of the Moment", Matt Blevins spent $550 on a locker and made a profit of $3,745.
In "Pirates of Pantego", Matt Blevins didn't buy a locker.
In "Float Like a Bubbafly", Kenny Stowe spent $725 on two lockers and made a profit of $5,775.
In "Excuse Me, I Think You're Stupid", Matt Blevins spent $850 on a locker and made a loss of -$20. Kenny Stowe didn't buy a locker.
In "Grounded & Pounded", Kenny Stowe spent $1,350 on a locker and made a profit of $470.
In "Hell's Half Acre", Matt Blevins spent $800 on a locker and made a profit of $485. Kenny Stowe didn't buy a locker.
In "Pow! Its a Surprise!", Kenny Stowe spent $900 on a locker and made a profit of $2,495. Matt Blevins didn't buy a locker.
In "Everything's Coming Up Sonny!", Kenny Stowe spent $825 on a locker and made a profit of $1,075.
In "When Vic Comes to Shove", Kenny Stowe spent $300 on a locker and made a profit of $1,095.
In "Waltz Across Texas", Kenny Stowe spent $600 on a locker and made a profit of $4,710.
In "Puffy the Auction Slayer", Jerry and Lesa bought a locker for $1,600 and made a profit of $855.
In "For the Benefit of Mr. Charles", Matt Blevins bought a locker for $850 and made a profit of $50.
In "Moe's Def", Moe Prigoff bought a locker for $1,050 and made a profit of $878.

References

Lists of American reality television series episodes
Episodes Texas
Texas-related lists